Ischnoscopa is a genus of moths of the family Crambidae. It contains only one species, Ischnoscopa chalcozona, which is found on Sumbawa.

References

Pyraustinae
Taxa named by Edward Meyrick
Monotypic moth genera
Moths of Indonesia
Crambidae genera